Dhaula is a small hamlet in Uttarkashi district of Uttarakhand. It is the starting point for the Rupin Pass trek.

Villages in Uttarkashi district